{|

{{Infobox ship career
|Hide header=
|Ship country=United States
|Ship flag=
|Ship name=USS Rhebal
|Ship namesake=Previous name retained
|Ship owner=
|Ship operator=
|Ship registry=
|Ship route=
|Ship ordered=
|Ship awarded=
|Ship builder=Great Lakes Boat Building Corporation, Milwaukee, Wisconsin
|Ship original cost=
|Ship yard number=
|Ship way number=
|Ship laid down=
|Ship launched=
|Ship sponsor=
|Ship christened=
|Ship completed=1917
|Ship acquired=15 August 1917 
|Ship commissioned=24 August 1917
|Ship recommissioned=
|Ship decommissioned=
|Ship maiden voyage= 
|Ship in service=
|Ship out of service=
|Ship renamed=
|Ship reclassified=
|Ship refit=
|Ship struck=
|Ship reinstated=
|Ship homeport=
|Ship identification=
|Ship motto=
|Ship nickname=
|Ship honours=
|Ship honors=
|Ship captured=
|Ship fate=Returned to owner 13 January 1919 or March 1919<ref>Dictionary of American Naval Fighting Ships at http://www.history.navy.mil/danfs/r5/rhebal.htm and NavSource Online: Section Patrol Craft Photo Archive Owaissa (SP 659).</ref>
|Ship notes=Operated as private motorboat Rhebal 1917 and from 1919
|Ship badge=
}}

|}
USS Rhebal (SP-1195) was a United States Navy patrol vessel in commission from 1917 to 1919.Rhebal was built as a private motorboat of the same name by the Great Lakes Boat Building Corporation at Milwaukee, Wisconsin, in 1917. On 15 August 1917, the U.S. Navy acquired her under a free lease from her owners,  A. R. Meyer and W. K. Hill of Boston, Massachusetts, for use as a section patrol boat during World War I. She was commissioned as USS Rhebal (SP-1195) on 24 August 1917.

Assigned to the 2nd Naval District in southern New England, Rhebal carried out patrol duties for the rest of World War I. During the summer of 1918, she served on outward patrol, working with the patrol boats USS Patrol No. 6 (SP-54), USS Owaissa (SP-659), and USS Felicia (SP-642), the submarine chaser , and a patrol boat with the section patrol number SP-50 of which no records have been found.Rhebal'' she was returned to Meyer and Hill on 13 January 1919 or in March 1919.

Notes

References

Department of the Navy Naval History and Heritage Command Online Library of Selected Images: Civilian Ships: Rhebal (American Motor Boat, 1917). Served as USS Rhebal (SP-1195) in 1917-1919
NavSource Online: Section Patrol Craft Photo Archive Owaissa (SP 659)

Patrol vessels of the United States Navy
World War I patrol vessels of the United States
Ships built in Milwaukee
1917 ships